Jacob Cunningham Davis (September 16, 1820 – December 25, 1883) was a politician, a U.S. Representative from Illinois. He was one of five men tried and acquitted in Illinois of the murder in 1844 of Joseph Smith, founder of the Latter Day Saint movement.

Political life
Born near Staunton, Virginia, Davis attended the common schools and the College of William & Mary, Williamsburg, Virginia. He moved to Warsaw, Illinois, in 1838, where he studied law. He was admitted to the bar and commenced practice in Warsaw. He served as clerk of Hancock County, Illinois. He was appointed circuit clerk in 1841.

He was elected and served in the Illinois Senate from 1842 to 1848 and again from 1850 until his resignation in 1856, having been elected to Congress.

Davis was elected as a Democrat to the Thirty-fourth Congress to fill the vacancy caused by the resignation of William A. Richardson. He served from November 4, 1856 to March 3, 1857. He was not a candidate for re-election. After leaving Congress, Davis resumed the practice of law in Clark County, Missouri. He died in Alexandria, Missouri, December 25, 1883. He was interred in Mitchell Cemetery, near Alexandria, Missouri.

Murder trial

In 1844, Davis was indicted and tried for the murders of Joseph Smith and Hyrum Smith. The Smiths had been imprisoned in Carthage Jail when the prison was stormed by an armed mob that shot and killed them. As a captain in command of the Warsaw Rifle Company of the Illinois militia, Davis was accused of having ordered his men to storm the prison. At trial, Davis and four other defendants were found by a jury to be not guilty of the murders.

Notes

References

 
 Marvin S. Hill. "Carthage Conspiracy Reconsidered: A Second Look at the Murder of Joseph and Hyrum Smith", Journal of the Illinois State Historical Society, Summer 2004.
"Jacob Cunningham Davis", Joseph Smith Papers

1820 births
1883 deaths
College of William & Mary alumni
People from Warsaw, Illinois
Politicians from Staunton, Virginia
Illinois lawyers
Missouri lawyers
Mormonism-related controversies
People acquitted of murder
American militia officers
Democratic Party Illinois state senators
Democratic Party members of the United States House of Representatives from Illinois
19th-century American politicians